Carolyn Bertram (born 21 April 1976) is a Canadian politician. She represented the electoral districts of Crapaud-Hazel Grove and Rustico-Emerald in the Legislative Assembly of Prince Edward Island from 2003 to 2015. She was a member of the Liberal Party.

Education and early career
Bertram received a Bachelor of Arts from the University of Prince Edward Island and a Bachelor of Education from Mount Saint Vincent University, and was a teacher by career.

Political career
She was elected to the Legislative Assembly of Prince Edward Island in the 2003 provincial election for the electoral district of Crapaud-Hazel Grove. In the 2007 election, she stood in the district of Rustico-Emerald, and was re-elected.

On June 12, 2007, Bertram was appointed to the Executive Council of Prince Edward Island as Minister of Communities, Cultural Affairs and Labour. In January 2010, Bertram was moved to Minister of Health and Wellness. Following her re-election in the 2011 election, Bertram was dropped from cabinet. On November 1, 2011, she was elected Speaker of the Legislative Assembly of Prince Edward Island.

Bertram did not seek re-election in 2015.

Electoral record

References

Living people
Members of the Executive Council of Prince Edward Island
Mount Saint Vincent University alumni
People from Queens County, Prince Edward Island
Prince Edward Island Liberal Party MLAs
Speakers of the Legislative Assembly of Prince Edward Island
University of Prince Edward Island alumni
Women MLAs in Prince Edward Island
1979 births
21st-century Canadian politicians
21st-century Canadian women politicians
Women government ministers of Canada
Women legislative speakers
Canadian schoolteachers